Sarah Campion (born 10 May 1983 in Chester), also known by her former name Sarah Kippax, is former professional squash player who represented England

Career
Based in Halifax became the first English woman in almost ten years to win three successive women's world tour titles when she clinched the Malco Open in Sweden in March 2009. 

She enjoyed a whirlwind second half to the year 2010 after she was selected for the 2010 Commonwealth Games. In the singles she reached the third round as the 10th seed. She also reached the quarter finals of the doubles. Soon after, she was part of the English team that won the silver medal at the 2010 Women's World Team Squash Championships.

She reached a career-high world ranking of World No. 15 in November 2011.

In 2012, she was part of the England team that won the silver medal at the 2012 Women's World Team Squash Championships.

Campion retired in 2014 and became the head coach at the Queens' Sport Club in Halifax.

Personal life
She married her coach David Campion at St Philip's Church in Kelsall, Cheshire.

References

External links 

English female squash players
Living people
1983 births
Sportspeople from Chester
Squash players at the 2010 Commonwealth Games
Commonwealth Games competitors for England